Bicyclus sophrosyne, the large velvet bush brown, is a butterfly in the family Nymphalidae. It is found in Nigeria, Cameroon, the Republic of the Congo, the Central African Republic, the Democratic Republic of the Congo, Uganda, Kenya, Tanzania and Zambia. The habitat consists of sub-montane forest.

Subspecies
Bicyclus sophrosyne sophrosyne (eastern Nigeria, Cameroon, Congo, Central African Republic, northern Democratic Republic of the Congo, Uganda, western Kenya, north-western Tanzania)
Bicyclus sophrosyne overlaeti Condamin, 1965 (south-eastern Democratic Republic of the Congo, Zambia)

References

Elymniini
Butterflies described in 1880
Butterflies of Africa